George Washington Ladd (September 28, 1818 – January 30, 1892) was a U.S. Representative from Maine.

Life history
Ladd was born on September 28, 1818 to Joseph and Sarah (Hamlin) Ladd  in Augusta, Massachusetts (now in Maine). Ladd attended the common schools and Kents Hill Seminary.

He engaged in the drug business in Bangor, Maine.

Ladd married Marcia C. P. Ingraham on October 9, 1839.

Later engaged in the lumber, commission, and wholesale grocery business in Bangor.
He was also interested in railroad development.

In 1868 Ladd was the Democratic Party nominee for Maine's 4th congressional district.

Ladd was elected as a Greenback Party candidate to the Forty-sixth and Forty-seventh Congresses (March 4, 1879 – March 3, 1883).  He was one of only 13 successful Greenback Party candidates for the 46th Congress, and one of 10 for the 47th.  In both congresses he was one of only four Greenback congressmen from the northeast, the party's major strength being in the Midwest and South.

Ladd served as chairman of the Committee on Expenditures in the Post Office Department (Forty-sixth Congress).

Ladd was an unsuccessful candidate for reelection in 1882 to the (Forty-eighth Congress).

Death and burial
Ladd died in Bangor, Maine, January 30, 1892. He was interred in Mount Hope Cemetery.

End notes

References

External links

1818 births
1892 deaths
Politicians from Augusta, Maine
Greenback Party members of the United States House of Representatives from Maine
Politicians from Bangor, Maine
Maine Democrats
Maine Whigs
Burials at Mount Hope Cemetery (Bangor, Maine)
19th-century American politicians
Members of the United States House of Representatives from Maine